Frank DeWitt Baldwin (December 25, 1928 – November 18, 2004) was an American professional baseball player, a catcher who played one full season in Major League Baseball with the  Cincinnati Redlegs.

Baldwin's full pro career lasted for a dozen seasons (1947–1956; 1958–1959). He originally signed with the Boston Braves, then played briefly in the Brooklyn Dodger organization before being selected by Cincinnati in the 1952 Rule 5 draft. As a member of the 1953 Redlegs, he played in only 16 games and batted 20 times, collecting two singles.  The first was a pinch hit off Pittsburgh Pirates' lefthander Paul LaPalme on May 2; the second came three weeks later, during one of his three 1953 starting catcher assignments, against Eddie Erautt of the St. Louis Cardinals. Baldwin was Cincinnati's third-string receiver that year, playing behind Andy Seminick and Hobie Landrith.  Ed Bailey and Hank Foiles, also rookies, also caught a handful of games for the Redlegs that season. They would go on to long MLB careers.

Baldwin returned to minor league baseball in 1954, and played five more seasons, mostly at the Double-A level.

Baldwin lived in both Hartwell and West Chester, Ohio, retiring in 1988 and moving to Beaver.

References

External links

Venezuelan Professional Baseball League statistics

1928 births
2004 deaths
Atlanta Crackers players
Baseball players from New Jersey
Baseball players from Ohio
Bluefield Blue-Grays players
Chattanooga Lookouts players
Cincinnati Redlegs players
Colorado Springs Sky Sox (WL) players
Evansville Braves players
Hartford Chiefs players
Major League Baseball catchers
Milwaukee Brewers (minor league) players
Minneapolis Millers (baseball) players
Nashville Vols players
New Orleans Pelicans (baseball) players
Oklahoma City Indians players
People from High Bridge, New Jersey
Sabios de Vargas players
Sportspeople from Hunterdon County, New Jersey
St. Paul Saints (AA) players
San Antonio Missions players
Victoria Rosebuds players
People from Tuscarawas County, Ohio
People from Beaver, Ohio